The Falmouth Hotel is a hotel on the seafront in the northeastern part of Gyllyngvase in Falmouth, Cornwall. The oldest hotel in Falmouth, it opened on 9 May 1865 to provide to tourists due to the new railway station being linked nearby. It is located next to the Royal Duchy Hotel. The foundation stone was laid on 6 August 1863, by Robert Tweedy and it cost about £9000. Additions were added in 1880, 1898 and 1972.

References

External links

The Falmouth Hotel

Hotels in Cornwall
Buildings and structures in Falmouth, Cornwall
Hotel buildings completed in 1865
1865 establishments in England